Nice & Slow is the fourth studio album of keyboardist Brian Culbertson released in 2001 on Atlantic Records. The album reached No. 1 on the Billboard Contemporary Jazz Albums chart and No. 2 on the Billboard Top Jazz Albums chart.

Overview
Artists such as Dave Koz, Jeff Lorber, Kirk Whalum, Kenny Lattimore and Herb Alpert appeared on the album.

Tracklisting

References

2001 albums
Atlantic Records albums